Banksia oreophila, commonly known as the western mountain banksia or mountain banksia, is a species of shrub that is endemic to the south-west of Western Australia. It has glabrous stems, wedge-shaped or narrow egg-shaped leaves with the narrower end towards the base, cylindrical spikes of pale pink to mauve flowers and later, up to twenty follicles in each spike, surrounded by the remains of the flowers. It occurs on slopes and hilltops in the Stirling and Barren Ranges.

Description
Banksia oreophila is a shrub that typically grows to a height of  but does not form a lignotuber. It has smooth grey or pale brown bark. The edges of the leaves are only sparsely serrated, if at all.

Taxonomy
This banksia was first formally described in 1869 by Ferdinand von Mueller in Fragmenta phytographiae Australiae and was given the name Banksia quercifolia var. integrifolia. In 1981, Alex George promoted it to species rank, however, as there was already a plant named Banksia integrifolia (coast banksia), George chose the name Banksia oreophila, from Greek words meaning "mountain-loving", referring to the habitat of this banksia.

George placed B. oreophila in subgenus Banksia, section Banksia, series Quercinae.

Distribution and habitat
Banksia oreophila grows in rocky places in low heath or shrubland, mostly on the upper slopes and summits of the Stirling Range and Barrens.

Conservation status
This banksia is listed as "not threatened" by the Western Australian Government Department of Parks and Wildlife.

Use in horticulture
Seeds do not require any treatment, and take 23 to 27 days to germinate.

References

oreophila
Eudicots of Western Australia
Plants described in 1869
Taxa named by Alex George